Glenn Andrew Carson, Jr. (born December 5, 1990) is an American football linebacker of the National Football League (NFL) who currently is a free agent.

High school and college career
Raised in the Manahawkin section of Stafford Township, New Jersey, Carson played prep football at Southern Regional High School, graduating in 2009. Carson enrolled full-time at Penn State University in January 2010 and played in his true freshman season with the Penn State Nittany Lions football team in fall 2010. Early in his career, Carson was overshadowed by other linebackers, including Michael Mauti, Gerald Hodges, and Nate Stupar. During his senior season, Carson anchored the Nittany Lions' linebacking corps, on September 21, 2013 making his 28th career start, most on the team.

Professional career

Arizona Cardinals
On May 12, 2014, Carson was signed by the Arizona Cardinals as an undrafted free agent. On August 31, 2015, he was cut by the Cardinals.

New York Giants
On December 30, 2015, the New York Giants signed Carson to their practice squad.

References

External links
Penn State Bio

1990 births
Living people
American football linebackers
Arizona Cardinals players
New York Giants players
Penn State Nittany Lions football players
People from Stafford Township, New Jersey
Players of American football from New Jersey
Southern Regional High School alumni
Sportspeople from Ocean County, New Jersey